Musabaqah Tilawatil Quran (Internationally known as Indonesia International Quran Competition) (literally "Quran Recitation Competition", abbreviated as MTQ) is an Indonesian Islamic religious festival held at national level, aimed at glorification of the Qur'an. On this festival, participants compete at reciting Al-Qur'an employing qira'at (specific methodology for recitation).

History
MTQ has been held in Indonesia since the 1940s following the founding of Jami'iyyatul Qurro wal Huffadz (Organization of Recitation and Memorization) by Nahdlatul Ulama, the largest Islamic mass organization in Indonesia. However at this stage the event was confined within regional level.

Since 1968, when the Minister of Religious Affairs K.H. Muhammad Dahlan (one of the leaders of the Nahdlatul Ulama Executive Board) held the event, MTQ has been instituted nationally. The first national level MTQ was held in Makassar in the month of Ramadan in 1968. At the time it only conducted adult recitations. The second MTQ was held in Banjarmasin in 1969. In 1970 the third MTQ was held in Jakarta with a very lively event. Some of the famed qaris (reciters) were discovered during these events. 

MTQ has been held 27 times as of 2018. West Sumatra will host the 28th National MTQ in 2020. Today, the subject for competition is not only limited to recitation but also includes speech and Islamic calligraphy.

MTQ is also organized within certain agencies. MTQ Wartawan for journalists is held regularly every three years and will enter the fifth game in 2008. MTQ Pertamina, held within Pertamina, the Indonesian state-owned oil and gas company, had stalled since 1980. MTQ Telkom under the name MAN (Musabawah Al-Quran Nasional), held within Telkom Indonesia, the largest telecommunications service company, will hold its 2008 game in Banda Aceh, making it the eighth festival.

Host
National MTQ (Musabaqah Tilawatil Qur'an Nasional) has held 28 times, here list of host of National MTQ:

 1968: Makassar, South Sulawesi
 1969: Bandung, West Java
 1970: Banjarmasin, South Kalimantan
 1971: Medan, North Sumatra
 1972: Jakarta City, Jakarta
 1973: Mataram, East Nusa Tenggara
 1974: Surabaya, East Java
 1975: Palembang, South Sumatra
 1976: Samarinda, East Kalimantan
 1977: Manado, North Sulawesi
 1979: Semarang, Central Java
 1981: Banda Aceh, Nangroe Aceh Darussalam
 1983: Padang, West Sumatra
 1985: Pontianak, West Kalimantan
 1988: Bandar Lampung, Lampung
 1991: Yogyakarta City, Yogyakarta
 1994: Pekanbaru, Riau
 1997: Jambi City, Jambi
 2000: Palu, Central Sulawesi
 2003: Palangkaraya, Central Kalimantan
 2006: Kendari, South East Sulawesi
 2008: Serang, Banten
 2010: Bengkulu City, Bengkulu
 2012: Ambon, Maluku
 2014: Batam, Riau Islands
 2016: Mataram, West Nusa Tenggara
 2018: Medan-Deli Serdang, North Sumatra
 2020: Padang-Padang Pariaman, West Sumatra
 2022: Banjarmasin, South Kalimantan

Notable participating qaris 
K.H. Aziz Muslim
K.H. Bashori Alwi
Hj. Rofiqoh darto Wahab
Hj. Nursiah Ismail
Hj. Aminah
Hj. Maria Ulfah
Muammar Z.A.
Muhammadong
Muhammad Ali
H. Wan Muhammad Ridwan Al-Jufrie
Mu'min Ainul Mubarak

References

Annual events in Indonesia
Islam in Indonesia
Quran reciting
Religious festivals in Indonesia